In Australian law, the one transaction rule or single transaction principle is when two or more offences are committed in the course of a single act, all sentences should be concurrent rather than consecutive.

Despite its imprecise nature, the one transaction rule is a long-standing sentencing principle recognised in Australia as a 'good working rule': Ruane v The Queen (1979) 1 A Crim R 284, 286 cited in R v White [2002] WASCA 112, [15]; see also Dickens v The Queen [2004] WASCA 179,

There is no hard and fast rule. In the end a judgment must be made to balance the principle that one transaction generally attracts concurrent sentences with the principle that the overall criminal conduct must be appropriately recognised and that distinct acts may in the circumstances attract distinct penalties. Proper weight must therefore be given to the exercise of the sentencing Judge's discretion.

References

DA Thomas, Principles of Sentencing (2nd ed, 1979) 53

Law of Australia